As Time Goes By may refer to:

Songs 
 "As Time Goes By" (song), a 1931 song written by Herman Hupfeld featured in the 1942 film Casablanca
 "As Time Goes By", a 1999 song by Hiroko Shimabukuro

Albums 
 As Time Goes By (Alfie Boe album), 2018
 As Time Goes By (Bobby Vinton and George Burns album), 1992
 As Time Goes By (Bryan Ferry album), 1999
 As Time Goes By (The Carpenters album), 2001
 As Time Goes By (Chet Baker album), 1986
 As Time Goes By (Duke Jordan album), 1985
 As Time Goes By (Harpers Bizarre album), 1976
 As Time Goes By: The Great American Songbook, Volume II, by Rod Stewart, 2003
 As Time Goes By, by Andy Bey, 1991
 As Time Goes By, by Lee Soo Young, 2005

Television 
 As Time Goes By (TV series), a 1992–2005 British sitcom and 1997–1999 radio series
 "As Time Goes By" (Boy Meets World)
 "As Time Goes By" (Kiddy Grade)
 "As Time Goes By" (M*A*S*H)
 "As Time Goes By" (Seven Days)
 "As Time Goes By" (Sliders)

Other media 
 As Time Goes By (1988 film), an Australian science fiction comedy by Barry Peak
 As Time Goes By (1997 film) (Gei Diy Chun Fung), a Taiwanese documentary by Ann Hui
 As Time Goes By (play), a 1971 play by Mustapha Matura
 As Time Goes By (novel), a 1998 novel by Michael Walsh, a sequel to the 1942 film Casablanca